Uralla is a town on the Northern Tablelands, New South Wales, Australia. According to the 2021 ABS census, the population of Uralla has slightly decreased to 2358. 

Boasting a rich history, Uralla has more than 50 buildings and sites of heritage significance which can be easily explored on foot or by vehicle.

The community collectively bought and restored McCrossins Mill in the 1980s and 1990s, and this is now a multi-award-winning museum, gallery and function centre still run by volunteers. This is also the starting point for the heritage walk.

History

The word "Uralla" was taken by the European squatters from the language of the local Aniwan tribe of Indigenous Australians. Uralla described a "meeting place", or more especially "a ceremonial meeting place and look-out on a hill".

During the early 1960s children at the Uralla Public School were taught that the name Uralla was an indigenous word which meant "chain of waterholes". This is an accurate description of the waterway which runs through the town. However, it is not known whether it has been verified by Indigenous linguistic studies.

Samuel McCrossin, an Irishman, his wife and seven children first came to Uralla in 1839 when they camped on the creek there. They returned to Morpeth and then again returned to Uralla in 1841 to finally settle there. In the 1830s and 40s the land was occupied by squatters who had moved north beyond the limits of settlement. The squatters were attracted by the prime sheep grazing land of the New England Tableland. Some of these squatting runs were Kentucky, Gostwyck, Balala, Yarrowyck, Mihi Creek, Terrible Vale and Salisbury Court. Some of these station buildings, including Balala and the Gostwyck Chapel, have now been placed on the Register of the National Estate. Some of the land occupied by these squatters was made available to smaller farmers after the passing of the Robertson Land Acts in 1861.

Uralla reached town status in 1855, spurred on by a gold rush in the Rocky River area three years earlier, swelling the town's size to over 5,000. In 1856 another and more considerable gold rush took place, but did not lead to any lasting development. By 1859 Uralla had three hotels, stores, a post office, a flour mill and a school. The Uralla Municipality was incorporated in 1882. In 1948, it became the administrative centre of the Uralla Shire after the municipality was merged with the former Gostwyck Shire. More gold was discovered and mined at Melrose in the Enmore area in about 1887. This discovery led to the erection of the Melrose public school and village, which was about 32 km east of Uralla. In 1927 this area was subdivided for soldier settlement, and ballots were held to determine the new settlers. In about 1889 gold was discovered at Groses Creek, which is 6 km southwest of Enmore, near the Mihi Falls on the eastern side of Uralla.

The infamous bushranger Captain Thunderbolt (Frederick Ward) is buried in the old Uralla Cemetery (John Street). There are many references to Thunderbolt throughout the town, and the locals are quite fond of the legend. In addition to an initially controversial statue in the main street, Uralla is host to a pub, motel, rock (from where Thunderbolt ambushed passing travellers) and roads, all bearing his name. On 25 May 1870, Thunderbolt was shot and killed near Uralla by Constable Alexander Walker during a highway robbery. However, a few Uralla locals claimed that it was his uncle, William (Harry) Ward - posing as Thunderbolt, who was killed at this time and not Fred Ward. The legend of Thunderbolt is exhibited at McCrossin's Mill Museum in Uralla and includes the series of 9 paintings by Phillip Pomroy of the events that led to Fred Ward's death.

During 2008 Uralla recorded the state's highest rise in property values at 35 per cent over the last 12 months, according to a report from Australian Property Monitors.

Climate
Uralla has an oceanic climate (Köppen: Cfb, Trewartha: Dobk/Cfbk), with warm summers and cool winters.

Population
According to the 2016 census of Population, there were 2,421 people in Uralla:
 Aboriginal and Torres Strait Islander people made up 11.7% of the population. 
 86.7% of people were born in Australia and 93.3% of people spoke only English at home.
 The most common responses for religion were Anglican 28.8%, No Religion 22.8% and Catholic 22.3%.

Heritage listings 
Uralla has a number of heritage-listed sites, including:
 6 East Street: New England Brass and Iron Lace Foundry
 Main Northern railway: Uralla railway station
 Salisbury Street: McCrossins Mill
 Uralla Square: Captain Thunderbolt's Grave
 New England Highway: Blanch's Royal Oak Inn
 New England Highway: Captain Thunderbolt's Rock

Industries

Three foundries account for a large amount of employment in the town, as do other metal manufacturing businesses. As Uralla is situated about halfway between Sydney and Brisbane, tourism contributes significantly to its economy, with a thriving village atmosphere and 20 National Parks within a two-hour drive. Due to Uralla's proximity to Armidale, larger shopping chains have avoided the small town and independent retailers remain. Examples include an antiquarian book store, numerous galleries, antique stores and cafes.

It is still possible to pan for gold in the rivers around the town, including the Rocky River. Today, the area is used for raising Merino sheep and is renowned for its super-fine and ultra-fine wool for use in the fashion industry. A number of vineyards have also been established and produce a variety of cool-climate wines. It is also a good area for growing apples and other fruit which require colder weather.

Lockheed Martin has erected an Australian satellite tracking station at Uralla.

Uralla is also host to a thriving community of artists and potters, stimulated by proximity to the University of New England in nearby Armidale.

The  found that the most common industries of all the employed people in the locality were:
 School Education - 6.7%
 Sheep, Beef Cattle and Grain Farming - 5.8%
 Local Government Administration - 5.0%
 Tertiary Education - 4.6%
 Cafes, Restaurants and Takeaway Food Services - 2.9%.

There are a number of environmental problems in the area, mainly caused by poor land management. Soil erosion, due to extensive logging and intensive farm practices is a major issue. Local government and community environmental bodies are now working to halt the problem.

Uralla Railway Station

Uralla station is served by the daily NSW TrainLink Xplorer service between Armidale and Sydney. The station is 16 minutes by train, from Armidale.

Gallery

See also
 New England (Australia)

References

External links

Uralla website
Captain Thunderbolt web site

 
Mining towns in New South Wales
Towns in New England (New South Wales)
Uralla Shire